The GWR 1400 Class is a class of steam locomotive designed by the Great Western Railway for branch line passenger work. It was originally classified as the 4800 Class when introduced in 1932, and renumbered in 1946.

Although credited to Charles Collett, the design dated back to 1868 with the introduction of the George Armstrong 517 class.

Precursors
Like the 48xx/14xx, the 517 Class was a lightweight loco for branchline work; it was built at Wolverhampton Works between 1868 and 1885.

In this period evolutionary changes included:

 517-570 – with  wheelbase, inside bearings to trailing wheels, and saddle tanks built 1868-1869.
 571-576 – with  wheelbase, outside bearings and side tanks built 1869-1870
 826-836, 838-849, 1154–1165, 202-05, 215-222, 1421–1432, 1433–1444, 1465-1482 – all with  wheelbase with side tanks built 1873-1883
 1483-1488 – with  wheelbase and side tanks built 1884-1885

From 1924 onwards, several were converted to run with an autocoach, and in this configuration were the direct ancestors of the 48xx class.

In this form, the updated 517s were but a small step away from the 48xx. New was the Collett-style cab and bunker and the boiler nominally to a new design. A three bar crosshead was added to the motion. This was a 1924 innovation introduced with the GWR 5600 Class and also seen in the 1930s-built 5400, 6400 and 7400 classes of pannier tanks.

Into service

The 4800 Class was designed as a more modern version of the 517 Class, which were by then beginning to show their relative age. The first locomotive, No 4800, was built by Swindon Works and entered service in 1932, with a further seventy-four engines of this type following up to 1936. During this period, Swindon also built twenty 5800 Class engines, which were broadly similar but which were not fitted with autotrain equipment or the Swindon top feed as later fitted to a number of 4800 class engines.

The 4800 Class locomotives retained their original numbers until the GWR decided to experimentally convert twelve 2800 Class 2-8-0s for oil-firing. It was decided that the converted engines would be reclassified as the 4800 Class and so the 75 tank locomotives already carrying this designation were reclassified as the 1400 Class with running numbers 1400-1474. The engines did not revert to their original classification after the experiment ended in 1948. They could reach a maximum speed of 80 mph which was much faster than the diesel railcars designed to replace them could reach.

The 1400 Class was designed to work with the GWR design of autocoach, a specialist coach designed for push-pull working and which could also be used with engines of other classes such as the 517s, the GWR 5400 Class, the GWR 6400 Class and the older GWR 2021 Class. This lack of auto gear was the cause of earlier scrapping of the 5800 Class as there was no work for them. The last, no. 5815, was withdrawn from Swindon shed in April 1961.

The auto-fitted locos fared little better; scrapping commenced in 1956 and all were withdrawn by early 1965. Nos. 1442 and 1450 were withdrawn from Exmouth Junction shed in May 1965. By the early 1960s several had been in store (parked in an out-of-the-way siding with a tarpaulin over the chimney) for some time, being occasionally steamed to replace failed diesels.

Preservation 

Four examples have been preserved, all late withdrawals from service in the 1963-1965 period. All went direct to preservation from British Railways in relatively good condition.

Loco numbers in bold mean their current number.

1442 spent its last years working between Tiverton and Tiverton Junction and became known as Tivvy Bumper. It was purchased by Lord Amory in 1965 for display at Tiverton.
During the 1990s it worked a number of Dawlish Donkey trips from Exeter St Davids to Newton Abbot.

In fiction 
 During the 1952 production of the Ealing comedy The Titfield Thunderbolt, 14xx locomotives Nos. 1401 and 1456 (doubling as 1401) were specially assigned to the film shoot, which took place primarily in the Limpley Stoke area. For this, the locomotives were temporarily allocated to Westbury locomotive depot.
 Oliver, in The Railway Series and its adaptation Thomas & Friends, is a member of this class. He carries a brakevan named Toad.

Models
 Airfix introduced a model of the 14xx in OO gauge in 1978.
Hornby Railways manufacture a model of the 14xx in OO gauge. 
Dapol manufactured a model of the 14xx for British N gauge in 2004 but has since ended production of this model.
 DJmodels produced models of the 14xx, 58xx and 48xx class locomotives in 00 gauge in 2018.
 Dapol released a version of the 14xx in O gauge in early 2020.

References

External links 

 The Great Western Archive – 1400 class
 South Devon Railway - Details of no. 1420 (includes drawing and specifications)
 GWR 14xx Class - Past & Present (includes operating history of the preserved examples)

0-4-2T locomotives
1400
Railway locomotives introduced in 1932
Standard gauge steam locomotives of Great Britain
Passenger locomotives